The Royal National Hotel is a 3-star hotel in Woburn Place, Bloomsbury, central London, England. It is the largest hotel in the United Kingdom by number of rooms, numbering 1,630, and is eight storeys tall.

References

External links

Hotels in London